Collin Chou (born 11 August 1967), sometimes credited as Ngai Sing, is a Taiwanese actor and martial artist.

Personal life 
Chou attended Pierce Community College in Los Angeles, United States. In addition to his native Mandarin, he also speaks English and Cantonese.

Career
Chou is best known in the United States for his portrayal of Seraph in the films The Matrix Reloaded and The Matrix Revolutions, and in the video game Enter the Matrix. In Asian cinema, Chou has co-starred with Jet Li, Donnie Yen and Sammo Hung in martial arts films such as Fearless (2006), and Flash Point (2007). He is also known for playing the antagonist Shang Wei in Hail the Judge (1994), which starred Stephen Chow and "Jade Warlord" in The Forbidden Kingdom (2008), which starred Jet Li and Jackie Chan. Collin Chou starred in Alice Wu's The Half of It as Leah Lewis's father.

Filmography

References

External links
https://archive.today/20130104165851/http://simonyam.com/hkmw/actors/collinchou/interview/
http://reddotdiva.blogspot.com/2011/06/collin-chou-takes-on-different-role-in.html
http://www.hkcinemagic.com/en/page.asp?aid=73&page=1
https://web.archive.org/web/20110616031141/http://collinchou.com/CollinChou/BIOGRAPHY.html
http://www.hkcinemagic.com/en/page.asp?aid=73&page=2
http://news.mtime.com/2012/03/31/1485533.html
http://people.mtime.com/1248788/filmographies/
http://movie.mtime.com/108169/
https://web.archive.org/web/20130325093441/http://jackiechan.com/scrapbook/206236--Talking-with-The-Forbidden-Kingdom-s-Collin-Chou
Official website

Collin Chou at chinesemov.com
Interview with Hong Kong Movie World
Interview with Kung Fu Cinema
Interview with Hong Kong Cinemagic
"Collin Chou: 'The one' for martial arts safety", USA Today, 18 November 2003.
CD Exclusive: Collin Chou Interview!

1967 births
Living people
Hong Kong male film actors
Taiwanese male film actors
Male actors from Kaohsiung